By the end of the 18th century the people of Tai-Phake entreated Assam located in Northeastern India, establishing their kingdom. The word Phake is derived from the Tai words 'Pha' meaning wall and 'Ke' meaning ancient or old.

Journey to Establish Own Kingdom 
The Tai-Phake people aimed to expand their kingdom in order to attain national recognition and enrich their people's daily lives. The Heads of the village conducted a series of movements and procedures across India to aid the expansion and recognition of the kingdom. To ensure some safety the oldest prince; Prince Chow allowed the army to follow him on this journey.

The eldest prince Chow Seukapha proceeded westwards, the second prince Chow Seukhanpha towards the east and Chow Seuchatpha towards the north from Yunnan along with their selected group of followers. The three princes consulted they're almanacs and embarked in three different directions. The youngest prince Chow Seuchatpha assumed leadership and established his reign in the historically rich kingdom of Yunnan.

To ensure the welfare of his people, the proliferation of his race and propagation of his supremacy, Chow Seukapha traversed the Patkai Hills and came down to Moung-Noon-Chun-Kham or the Kingdom of Assam in 1228 AD and established the Tai-Ahom kingdom in Assam.

Journey of Tai-Phakes with Chow Seukhanpha 
The Tai-Phakes joined as contingent to the group who wished to establish a large kingdom under the leadership of the second prince Chow Seukhanpha. Seukanpha had moved ahead with his soldiers and people in the northern direction from Yunnan and established his kingdom in Moung-Kwang (Mogawng) situated in present-day Burma (Myanmar). The king ordered the Phakes to settle on their own and start their livelihood in a place called Hukawng Valley in 1215 AD in consensus to the king's order.

Three rivers flowed through the heart of Hukawng valley. These three rivers were: Khe-Nan-Turung, Khe-Nan-Taram and Khe-Nan-Chalip. They flowed and united into a single body of water near a stone wall of huge magnitude forming a gorge to a river since antiquity against which the waves of the three rivers violently bespattered. The Tai people inhabiting within the vicinity called this wall of the old mountain as Pha-Ke. "Pha" means a great stone and "Ke" means old. Thus Pha-Ke means the wall of an old hill or in other words the Tai people inhabiting near the side of the old mountain.

The Hukawng valley inhabited by the Phakes was then bounded in the east by the Lang-Ta hills on the other side of which was the principality of the Tai-Khamptis. To the west were the Pungyi-Punga hills. The Patkai hills bounded the northern limits on the other side of which stretched the green crops of Assam, to its south were the Jampu hills on the foothill tracts of which the Phakes resided.

Annexation of Hukawng Valley By Burmese King 
The Tai-Phakes resided in the Hukawng valley for more than 400 years after which the entire Hukawng valley came under the supremacy of the then king of Burma. The oppressive anarchical administration and tyranny of the Burmese king made the Tai-Phakes anxious. It was at about this time that the Phakes came in contact with the Singpho people during the year 1247 AD. While they were residing on the foothills of the Jampu hills, the cautious and wise among the Phakes and Singpho people began to salvage themselves from the oppression of the king. They decided to remain united and mutually help each other in testing times of adversity, and for that, they slaughtered a buffalo and had a special feast of its meat.

Both the Phakes and the Singphos passed their misfortune filled days. Then according to a written agreement, they resolved to establish a strong, stable and independent kingdom away from the willful rule of the Burmese king. All through the night and the dense fog that covered up the dark cloudy skies, the Phakes and the Singphos discussed and unanimously dawned on the decision to abandon their erstwhile home in Hukawng and almost immediately embarked on their quest to establish an independent kingdom of their own.

Tai-Phakes Abandon Hukawng Valley And Migrate To India 
In 1775 AD the Tai-Phake people travelled towards the green valley of Assam, travelling the same route taken by King Seukapha.  The Singphos and the Phakes traversed Patkai and came to rest in a place bordering Assam and Burma. They called this place Pang-Sao. "Pang" means place and "Sao" means rest. Thus Pang-Sao means resting place.

Learning of the Tai-Phake people's journey, the King forced them to retreat.  In response to this, the Tai-Phake people abandoned Pang-Sao and resumed their journey towards the plains of Assam. During the journey, the Tai-Phake people came to the bank of a large pond filled with moss,  situated in the state of Arunachal Pradesh. They made the pond their centre and called it Nong-Taw. "Nong-Taw" directly translates to the moss-filled pond. Towards the end of 1775 AD the Phakes and the Singphos settled and started a stable society in this plain stretch of land where the two groups lived for a few years. During the time that they lived in Nong-Taw the Phakes also came into close contact with the Khamptis. When the Sadiya Khowa king heard about the settlement of the Phakes and the Singphos at Nong-Taw he dispatched a huge army to destroy them.  Resulting in a coup against the Sadiya Khowa king in 1797 AD.

References

External links 
 Namphakiyal village
 Ethnologue profile
 Tribes settled near Patkai hills
 Books related with Tai-Phake language

Northeast India
Demographic history of India